Marcello Creti (16 April 1922, in Rome – 1 January 2000, in Sutri) was an Italian inventor, gem prospector, and reported healer who for a time led a group in a farm called Sapientia. In youth he was hailed for his inventions and in 1940 won the Gold Medal of the Fascist Syndicate of Inventors. One of these inventions involved the automobile. Later in life he became known for his eccentric views and was included in The Big Book of Weirdos by Carl A Posey and Gahan Wilson.

References

External links 
Marcello Creti site

20th-century Italian inventors
1922 births
2000 deaths